Julian Heidrich (born 27 June 1991), better known as simply Julian Le Play, is an Austrian singer-songwriter and radio presenter. He is best known for his 2014 single "Mein Anker" peaking at number 6 on the Austrian Singles Chart. So far he has released three studio albums, Soweit Sonar in 2012, Melodrom in 2014 and Zugvögel in 2016.

Career

2010–12: Soweit Sonar
On 3 December 2010 he released his debut single "Australian Gate" under his birth name Julian Heidrich. The song peaked at number 26 on the Austrian Singles Chart. On 20 April 2012 he released the singles "Mr. Spielberg" and "4 gewinnt" under the name Julian Le Play. "Mr. Spielberg" peaked at number 29 on the Austrian Singles Chart. On 14 September 2012 he released the single "Philosoph". The song peaked at number 26 on the Austrian Singles Chart. He released his debut studio album Soweit Sonar on 28 September 2012, peaking to number 5 on the Austrian Albums Chart. "Land in Sicht" was released as the fourth single from the album.

2013–14: Melodrom
On 26 April 2013 he released "Der Wolf" as the lead single from his second studio album. The song peaked at number 47 on the Austrian Singles Chart. On 31 January 2014 he released "Mein Anker" as the second single from the album. The song peaked at number 6 on the Austrian Singles Chart. He released his second studio album Melodrom on 28 February 2014. The album peaked at number 3 on the Austrian Albums Chart. On 4 July 2014 he released "Rollercoaster" as the third single from the album. The song peaked at number 17 on the Austrian Singles Chart. "Wir haben noch das ganze Leben" was released as the fourth single from the album in November 2014, peaking to number 35 on the Austrian Singles Chart.

2016–present: Zugvögel
On 18 March 2016 he released "Hand in Hand" as the lead single from his third studio album, peaking to number 14 on the Austrian Singles Chart. He will release his third studio album Zugvögel on 15 April 2016.

Discography

Albums

Singles

References

External links
 Julian Le Play on Facebook

1991 births
Living people
Austrian singer-songwriters
21st-century Austrian male singers